Musba Hashmi is an Indian journalist and the editor-in-chief of a Mysore-based media outlet Web News Observer. She was born on August 10, 1996, and attended the Amity University, graduating in 2017. Before joining Web News Observer, she has worked with The Pioneer and Pinkvilla as a Journalist.

References 

Living people
1996 births
Indian newspaper editors
Indian business and financial journalists
Journalists from Uttar Pradesh